Embassy Building No. 10 is a historic building located at 3149 16th Street Northwest, Washington, D.C., in the Columbia Heights neighborhood.  Although as the name implies it was built to be a foreign mission, it was never in fact used as such; instead, it served as the central office of the District's municipal parks department for nearly seventy years.

History
The Renaissance revival building was designed in 1928 by George Oakley Totten, Jr., and constructed by Mary Foote Henderson in 1929–1930 as part of her attempt to create a new Embassy Row "in the vicinity of Meridian Hill Park and Mount Pleasant".  
She died in 1931 and, perhaps due to "the onset of the Depression as well as the failure of Henderson's heirs to pursue her business interests", the building never became an embassy.  It was vacant for several years, then became a residence and boarding house during the late Depression.

In 1940, Embassy Building No. 10 became the headquarters of what is now the District of Columbia Department of Parks and Recreation. 
The building was added to the National Register of Historic Places on November 6, 1986.  
Although the ways in which the building responds to its site make up a part of its National Register nomination — "The symmetry of the facade belies the actual form and plan, designed for  the wedge-shaped lot situated in the acute angle formed by the intersection of Lament and Sixteenth Streets, N.W." — the context has been lost: at some point, the section of Lamont Street adjacent to the building was closed, consolidated with the property immediately to the north, and turned into a parking lot and playground.

In 2012, the DC DPR moved "its central office operations…to two new locations" in order to "provid[e] a better working environment for DPR employees, and a place to better serve customers" than was possible in the aging building.  As of early 2021, it has been vacant ever since.

References

Columbia Heights, Washington, D.C.
Houses completed in 1928
Houses on the National Register of Historic Places in Washington, D.C.
Renaissance Revival architecture in Washington, D.C.